Radici may refer to:

Radici (album), a 1972 album by Francesco Guccini
Radići, a village in the municipality of Goražde, Bosnia and Herzegovina
Radici Group, an Italian corporation specialized in chemical production of polyamide polymers, synthetic fibres and nonwovens

People with the surname
Fausto Radici (1953–2002), Italian alpine skier 
Luigi Induini Radici (1929-1972),  Italian actor

See also 
Radice

Italian-language surnames